Anna Margaretha Donner (née Lyhtberg; 11 February 1726 – 24 September 1774) was a Swedish businessperson. She was known as "Donner Mum", "Madam Donner", and "Madam Herr Donner" ("Mr Madame Donner").

Life
Born in Visby, Sweden to merchants Mathias Lythberg and Johanna Wihadi, she was given a good education, and was active as her father's business assistant.

In 1744, she married the German merchant Jürgen Hinrich Donner from Lübeck. They settled in Visby on Gotland in 1746, and had four children. They bought a building in Visby where they founded an empire of import and export with Germany and Great Britain. The building is now known as ”The Donner House”, and the square by which the building is located was to be known as: ”Donner's place”. Margaretha was the company's accountant.

When she became a widow in 1751, she took sole control over the business as director. She made herself responsible for the export, and created a merchant fleet with twenty ships. She also founded a factory on Gotland. She was appreciated by her employees, and called ”Donner Mum” by some, and ”Madam Donner” by others: some of her German business-partners could not imagine a woman as head of such a big business empire, and by them she was sometimes called "Madam Herr Donner" ("Mr Madame Donner").

She helped her two sons to start their own business, but she did not allow them any influence in her own affairs, and she did not acquaint them with the main business until after she acquired tuberculosis, of which she died at Visby in 1774. The Donner empire expanded under her sons, both of whom included their wives in their work. The business eventually went bankrupt in 1845.

See also 
 Ingela Gathenhielm

References
 Herr Madam Donner - Uppsats
 Donnerska huset i Visby
 Boken om Gotland - Andra delen, 1945, AB Sylve Norrbys Bokhandel
 Gotland 1500-1900, ett särtryck ur Den svenska historien, Gotlands Fornsal
 Lingegård Ingeborg, 1985, Gotländska föregångskvinnor, Taurus förlag
 Svahnström Gunnar, 1984, Visby under tusen år, Almqvist & Wiksell Förlag AB
 Öhman Roger, 1994, Vägen till Gotlands historia, Visby, Gotlands Fornsal/Gotlands Läromedelscentral

Further reading 
 

1726 births
1774 deaths
People from Gotland
18th-century deaths from tuberculosis
Swedish merchants
Age of Liberty people
Tuberculosis deaths in Sweden
18th-century Swedish businesswomen